M16 is a metropolitan route  in Johannesburg, South Africa. It begins in the north-western suburb of Greenside and heads eastwards through some of Johannesburg's northern suburbs and through Edenvale to end at the East Rand town of Kempton Park.

Route
Starting at an intersection with the M71 (Barry Hertzog Avenue) in Greenside, the route heads east as Greenhill Road to Parkview Golf Club. It then crosses the golf course and the Braamfontein Spruit as Wicklow Avenue. Crossing Emmarentia Avenue it continues south-east until it reaches a t-junction with Westcliff Drive and continues eastwards as the latter circling the Westcliff suburb and reaches the M27 road (Jan Smuts Avenue). The M16 route turns right into Jan Smuts Avenue and is cosigned briefly before turning left into Upper Park Drive, Forest Town where it follows the southern border of the Johannesburg Zoo and then becomes Erlsworld Way in Saxonwold. Outside the South African National Museum of Military History turns right into East World Way. It continues eastwards crossing over Oxford Road and becomes Riviera Road in Killarney before reaches the M1 North motorway interchange.

Crossing the M1 motorway it reaches a t-junction with M31 West Street in Houghton Estate where it turns south cosigned briefly before turning left and head east as 1st Avenue in Houghton passing close to Houghton Golf Course before intersecting the M11 Louis Botha Avenue. Turning left, now cosigned with the M11 Louis Botha Avenue it heads northwards into Orange Grove. Passing 8th Street (M16 one-way west) where the route leaves Louis Botha Avenue turning east into 10th Street (one-way east) before turning right in 9th Avenue and left into Club Street where it continues eastward close to Royal Johannesburg & Kensington Golf Club and then turns northwards past Huddle Park in Linksfield.

There it reaches the intersection with Civin Drive which the route crosses over it and turns eastwards as Linksfield Road where it crosses the N3 Eastern Bypass at the Linksfield Road Interchange. Continuing east through Dowerglen it enters Edenvale crossing the M97 1st Avenue and becomes 2nd Street (one-way east) passing through the CBD while Horwood Street to the south is the one-way M16 East. Leaving the CBD, it crosses 11th Avenue it becomes Homestead Road crossing JP Bezuidenhout Park to the north and the cemetery to the south before crossing Paliser Road becoming Baker Road in Edenglen where it eventually reaches M78 Harris Avenue. Turn right into Harris Avenue it heads south, briefly cosigned with the M78 before Harris Avenue breaks off to the left continuing eastwards passing Harmelia and reaches a t-junction with Sandvale Road where the route turns left.

Continuing northwards it reaches the intersection of Driefontein and Barbara Road in Isandovale. The route crosses over and continues north-east through Croydon and reaches the intersection with Isando Road. Crossing over it continues a north-easterly route following the R24 freeway to its right through the industrial suburb of Spartan. The route then ends as a t-junction with the M57 road (Pretoria Road) in Kempton Park.

References 

Streets and roads of Johannesburg
Metropolitan routes in Johannesburg